As of 2015, there were at least five Sanskrit translations available of the Tirukkural.

History of translations
Despite its thin popularity as a spoken and colloquial language, Sanskrit is considered divine and a language of revelation by scholars. This resulted in more than five translations available of the Kural text in Sanskrit. Unlike in other languages where maiden attempts of translating the Kural text is widely made in prose, all translations in Sanskrit are made in verse in the form of typical slokas. This is because historically Sanskrit literature has been in verse, for which it has gained renown.

It is believed that in the 18th century, Thyagasamudram Shri Chakrapani Iyer, a relative of the eminent Tamil scholar U. V. Swaminatha Iyer, translated the Kural text into Sanskrit for the first time. Per available records, the Kural was translated into Sanskrit for the first time in 1922 by Appa Vajapeyin. It was published by Gururajachariar under the title Suniti Kusuma Mala at Kumbakonam. The second translation was published in 1937–1940 by Sankara Subramanya Sastri, who published it as "Sugati Ratnaakaraa" in the journal Sahridaya. Another translation was published in verse by an anonymous translator in 1940 (perhaps believed to be Vidya Bhushanam Pandit Shri Govindaraya Shastri, a Jain). It was published in Delhi and contained prose explanation in Hindi.

The fourth translation was made by Kaliyan Ramanuja Jeer in 1956. It was published in Nanguneri. The fifth one was a translation by Sanskrit scholar S. N. Sriramadesikan, which was published in 1961 and in 1978. It was published in Madras by Sarasa Kala Nilayam. Besides translating Tirukkural into Sanskrit, he has translated several other Tamil classics such as Ettuthogai (Eight Anthologies), Pathupāttu (Ten Idylls), Silappadikāram, Thiruppāvai, Kambarāmāyanam, Nāladiyār etc.

The sixth translation was published in 1983 by H. A. Chakrapani Iyer under the title "Tiruvalluvar in Sanskrit". The seventh translation was published in January 2021 by V. Indrajithu. It was a complete translation in verse.

Translations

See also
 Tirukkural translations
 List of Tirukkural translations by language

References

External links
 Sanskrit scholar and Kural translator Srirama Desikan

Sanskrit
Translations into Sanskrit